Fiqiri Thoma Duro (born 1939) is an Albanian footballer. He played in four matches for the Albania national football team from 1963 to 1965.

References

External links
 

1939 births
Living people
Albanian footballers
Albania international footballers
Place of birth missing (living people)
Association football forwards
FK Dinamo Tirana players